Eleonore of Anhalt-Zerbst (10 November 1608, in Zerbst – 2 November 1681, in Østerholm Castle, Als) was a member of the House of Ascania and a princess of Anhalt-Zerbst by birth and by marriage Duchess of Schleswig-Holstein-Sonderburg-Norburg.

Life 
Eleanor was a daughter of Prince Rudolph of Anhalt-Zerbst (1576-1621) from his first marriage to Dorothea Hedwig (1587-1609), daughter of Duke Heinrich Julius of Brunswick-Wolfenbüttel.

She married on 15 February 1632 in Norburg with Duke Frederick of Schleswig-Holstein-Sønderburg-Norburg (1581-1658).  She was his second wife.  The ducal court in Nordborg had meager financial resources and Eleanor's children had to seek a career elsewhere.   The theologian Christoph Wilhelm Megander acted as her confessor from 1653 onwards.  During the reign of her step-son John Bogislaw, the duchy experienced a bankruptcy and the fief was terminated by Denmark.

Eleanor died in 1681 on her widow's seat Østerholm Castle on Als and was buried beside her husband.

Issue 
From her marriage Eleanor had the following children:
 Unnamed child  (1633–1633)
 Elisabeth Juliane (1634–1704)
 married in 1656 Duke Anton Ulrich of Brunswick-Wolfenbüttel (1633–1714)
 Dorothea Hedwig, abbess of Gandersheim Abbey from 1665 to 1678
 married in 1678 Count Christopher of Rantzau-Hohenfeld (1625–1696)
 Christian Augustus (1639–1687), English admiral
 Louise Amöna (1642–1685)
 married in 1665 Count John Frederick I of Hohenlohe-Neuenstein-Oehringen (1617–1702)
 Rudolph Frederick (1645–1688)
 married in 1680 Countess Bibiane of Promnitz (1649–1685)

See also 
 Principality of Anhalt
 House of Ascania

References 
 August B. Michaelis, Julius Wilhelm Hamberger: Einleitung zu einer volständigen Geschichte der Chur- und Fürstlichen Häuser in Teutschland, Meyer, 1760, p. 587
 Hans Nicolai Andreas Jensen: Versuch einer kirchlichen Statistik des Herzogthums Schleswig, vol. 2, Kastrup, 1841, p. 1636

Footnotes 

House of Ascania
1608 births
1681 deaths
17th-century German people
German princesses
German duchesses
Royal reburials
Daughters of monarchs